Clube Desportivo das Aves is a futsal team based in Vila das Aves, Portugal, that played in the Portuguese Futsal First Division. It is a part of the C.D. Aves sports club. In 2017 Desportivo das Aves won the North Zone series of the Portuguese II Divisão Futsal achieving the promotion to the first tier Liga Sport Zone.

References

External links
 CD Aves official website
 Zerozero

Futsal clubs in Portugal